Kuih seri muka, sri muka or putri salat (lit. pretty face cake) is a Banjarese and Malay two-layered dessert with steamed glutinous rice forming the bottom half and a green custard layer made with pandan juice (hence the green colour). Coconut milk is a key ingredient in making this kue. It is used to impart creamy taste when cooking the glutinous rice and making the custard layer. This kue found in Indonesia (especially in South Kalimantan), Malaysia and Singapore.

In 2009, the Malaysian Department of National Heritage declared seri muka as one of 100 Malaysian heritage foods and drinks.

See also 

 Kue
 List of desserts
 List of Indonesian desserts
 List of steamed foods
 Banjarese cuisine
 Malay cuisine

Notes

External links 
  Malay Dessert

Kue
Indonesian desserts
Malay cuisine
Malaysian desserts
Steamed foods